Flora Gionest-Roussy is a French Canadian actor, photographer, singer and songwriter.

Biography 
Born in Chandler, Quebec and raised in the village of Pabos Mills, Gionest struggled with anti-queer bullying for years before dropping out of high school at 15 and leaving their hometown at 17. He became homeless in Montreal for two years before launching Silver Catalano as a drag musical project, first attracting widespread attention in 2016 for their synthwave single "Wave".

His musical career has been marked by LGBTQ+ activism, including being a part of the first drag show ever staged in the Gaspésie—Les Îles-de-la-Madeleine.

References

Living people
Canadian LGBT rights activists
People from Gaspésie–Îles-de-la-Madeleine
Non-binary musicians
Non-binary models
Non-binary activists
Canadian non-binary actors
Musicians from Quebec
Canadian electronic musicians
1995 births
Canadian LGBT singers
21st-century Canadian singers
21st-century Canadian LGBT people